This list of wars by death toll includes all deaths that are either directly or indirectly caused by the war. These numbers usually include the deaths of military personnel which are the direct results of battle or other military wartime actions, as well as the wartime/war-related deaths of soldiers which are the results of war-induced epidemics, famines, atrocities, genocide, etc.

Pre-modern (before 1500 AD)

Ancient wars (before 500 AD) 

Note 1: The geometric mean is the middle of the quoted range, taken by multiplying together the endpoints and then taking the square root.

Medieval wars (500–1500 AD) 

Note: the identity of a single "war" cannot be reliably given in some cases, and some "wars" can be taken to last over more than a human lifetime,  e.g.
"Reconquista" (711–1492, 781 years)
"Muslim conquests in the Indian subcontinent" (12th to 16th c., 500 years)
"Crusades" (ten or more campaigns during the period 1095–1291, 196 years),
"Mongol invasions and conquests" (1206–1368, 162 years),
"early Muslim conquests" (622–750, 128 years),
"Hundred Years' War" (1337–1453, 116 years).

Modern

Modern (1500 AD–present) wars with greater than 25,000 deaths

Modern wars with fewer than 25,000 deaths by death toll

 22,211 – Croatian War of Independence (1991–1995)
 22,000+ – Dominican Restoration War (1863–1865)
 21,000+ – Six-Day War (1967)
 20,068 – Reform War (1857–1860)
 20,000+ – Yaqui Wars (1533–1929)
 20,000+ – War of the Quadruple Alliance (1718–1720)
 20,000+ – Ragamuffin War (1835–1845)
 20,000+ – Italo-Turkish War (1911–1912)
 20,000 – Anglo-Spanish War (1727–1729)
 19,619+ – Rhodesian Bush War (1964–1979)
 19,000+ – Mexican–American War (1846–1848)
 18,069–20,069 – First Opium War (1839–1842)
 17,294+ – 1940–44 insurgency in Chechnya (1940–1944)
 17,200+ – First Anglo-Afghan War (1839–1842)
 16,765–17,065 – Balochistan conflict (1948–present)
 16,000+ – War of the Pacific (1879–1883)
 16,000+ – Nepalese Civil War (1996–2006)
 16,000+ – Spanish–American War (1898)
 15,200–15,300 – Peasants' War (1798) – Part of the French Revolutionary Wars
 15,000+ – Nigerian Sharia conflict (2009–present)
 15,000 – Anglo-Spanish War (1654–1660)
 14,460–14,922 – South African Border War (1966–1990)
 14,077–22,077 – Mau Mau Uprising (1952–1960)
 13,929+ – Republic of the Congo Civil War (1997–1999)
 13,812+ – Naxalite-Maoist insurgency (1967–present)
 13,100–34,000 – Kurdish separatism in Iran (1918–present)
 13,073–26,373 – 1948 Arab–Israeli War (1948–1949)
 11,500–12,843 – Indo-Pakistani War of 1971 – Part of the Bangladesh Liberation War
 10,700–14,300 – Yom Kippur War (1973)
 10,000+ – Assam separatist movements (1979–present)
 10,000+ – Malayan Emergency (1948–1960)
 10,000+ – War in Donbas – Part of the Russian military intervention in Ukraine (2014–present)
 10,000+ – Rwandan Civil War (1990–1994)
 10,000+ – First Italo-Ethiopian War (1894–1896)
 10,000+ – Second Melillan campaign (1909)
 10,000+ – Hispano-Moroccan War (1859–60)
 10,000+ – Spanish conquest of Tripoli (1510)
 9,400+ – Libyan Civil War (2011) (2011)
 8,136+ – Iraqi insurgency (2011–2013)
 7,500–21,741 – War of 1812 (1812–1815)
 7,400–16,200 – Yemeni Civil War (2015–present) (2015–present)
 7,050+ - Portuguese conquest of Goa (1510)
 7,104+ – Indo-Pakistani War of 1947 (1947–1949)
 7,000+ – Chadian Civil War (2005–10) (2005–2010)
 6,800–13,459 – Indo-Pakistani War of 1965 (1965)
 6,859+ – 2020 Nagorno-Karabakh conflict (2020–present)
 5,641–6,991 - Opposition–ISIL conflict during the Syrian Civil War ( 2014–present )
 6,543+ – South Thailand insurgency (2004–present)
 6,295+ – Central African Republic conflict (2012–present)
 5,641+ – Sudanese nomadic conflicts (2009–present)
 5,100+ – Gaza–Israel conflict (2006–present) – Part of the Arab–Israeli conflict
 5,000+ – Casamance conflict (1982–2014)
 5,000+ – Chilean Civil War of 1891 (1891)
 5,000+ – Cuban Revolution (1953–1959)
 5,000 – War of the Reunions (1683–1684)
 4,715+ – Libyan Civil War (2014–present) (2014–present)
 4,275 – Dominican Civil War (1965)
 4,200+ – Shifta War (1963–1967)
 4,000–10,000 – Conflict in the Niger Delta (2004–present)
 4,000 – War of Devolution (1667–1668)
 3,699+ – Al-Qaeda insurgency in Yemen (1992–present)
 3,552+ – First Schleswig War (1848–1852)
 3,529+ – The Northern Ireland Troubles (1966–1998)
 3,366+ – Insurgency in the North Caucasus (2009–2017)
 3,270+ – Second Schleswig War (1864)
 3,222–3,722 – Hungarian Revolution of 1956 (1956)
 3,144+ – Allied Democratic Forces insurgency (1996–present)
 3,114+ – 1947–48 Civil War in Mandatory Palestine (1947–1948) –  Part of the 1948 Palestine war
 3,007+ – War of the Golden Stool (1900)
 3,000–6,000 – Negro Rebellion (1912)
 3,000–5,000 – Croatian-Slovene Peasant Revolt (1573) 
 3,000+ – Second Ivorian Civil War (2010–2011)
 3,000+ – Dominican War of Independence (1844)
 3,000+ – Banana Wars (1914–1933)
 2,944+ – Insurgency in the Maghreb (2004–present)
 2,800+ – Northern Mali conflict (2012–present)
 2,781+ – Iranian Revolution (1978–1979)
 2,751+ – Third Anglo-Afghan War (1919)
 2,557+ – Sudan internal conflict (2011–present) (2011–present)
 2,394+ – Sinai insurgency (2011–present)
 2,300+ – Conflict in the Niger Delta (2003–present)
 2,221–2,406 – 2014 Israel–Gaza conflict (2014) – Part of the Gaza–Israel conflict
 2,150+ – Persian Expedition of 1796 (1796)
 2,096+ – Aden Emergency (1963–1967)
 2,054+ – South Yemen insurgency (2009–2015)
~2,014 – Irish War of Independence (1919–1921)
 2,000–3,800 - Albanian Civil War (1997)
 2,000+ – Costa Rican Civil War (1948)
 2,000+ – Six-Day War (2000) (2000)
 2,000+ – 2010 South Kyrgyzstan ethnic clashes (2010)
 2,000 – Iran crisis of 1946 (1946)
 1,810+ – Anglo-Iraqi War (1941)  – Part of World War II
 1,774+ – Lapland War (1944–1945)  – Part of World War II
 1,648 – Sinaloa Cartel-Gulf Cartel conflict ( 2003–present )
 1,643–2,237 – Transnistria War (1992)
 1,561 – Islamic State-related terrorist attacks in Turkey (2013–present)
 1,500+ – Irish Civil War (1922–1923)
 1,480 – Ifni War (1957–1958)
 1,449+ – M23 rebellion (2012–2013) – Part of the Kivu Conflict
 1,444 – Taliban-ISIL conflict in Afghanistan ( 2015–present )
 1,300+ – Allied Democratic Forces insurgency (1996–present)
 1,295+ – Siachen conflict (1984–present)
 1,229+ – Basque conflict (1959–2011)
 1,227–5,600 – Kargil War (1999)
 1,000–1,500 – Cabinda conflict (1994–present)
 1,000+ – Djiboutian Civil War (1991–1994)
 1,000+ – 1991–92 South Ossetia War (1991–1992)
 1,000+ – Xinjiang conflict (1960–present)
 1,000+ – Chincha Islands War (1864–1866)
 1,000+ – Houthi–Saudi Arabian conflict (2015–present) – Part of the Yemeni Civil War (2015–present)
 1,000 – Second Mafia War (1980-1983)
 907 – Falklands War (1982)
 898 – Barbary Wars (1801–1815)
 864 – Jamaican political conflict (1943–present)
 850 – Syrian Civil War spillover in Lebanon (2011–2017) – Part of the Syrian Civil War
 846 – 2011 Egyptian revolution (2011)
 808 – Sino-Russian border conflicts (1652–1689)
 789–1,874 – 2001–02 India–Pakistan standoff (2001–2002)
 771 – Insurgency in Egypt (2013–present) (2013–present)
 740 – Indonesia–Malaysia confrontation (1963–1966)
 722 – Kamwina Nsapu rebellion (2016–present)
 700–800 – Anglo-Aro War (1901–1902)
 670+ – Infighting in the Gulf Cartel (2010–present)
 659–2,496 – Russia–Georgia war (2008)
 650+ – Infighting in Los Zetas (2010–present)
 643–1,500 – Sudanese conflict in South Kordofan and Blue Nile (2011–present)
 621 – Second 'Ndrangheta war (1985-1991)
 316 – Chiapas conflict (1994–present)
 300+ – Islamic Army–Al-Qaeda conflict (2006-2007)
 547 – Cyprus Emergency (1955–1959)
 542 – East Prigorodny Conflict (1992)
500 – Anglo-Zanzibar War (1896)
 422 – Franco-Thai War (1940–1941)
 327 – RENAMO insurgency (2013–present)
 275–569 – Second Afar insurgency (1995–present) Part of the Eritrean–Ethiopian border conflict
 236 – Batwa-Luba clashes (2013–present)
 233 – First 'Ndrangheta war (1974–1976)
 233 – Anglophone Crisis (2017–present)
 217 – Cuban invasion of the Dominican Republic (1959)
 213–523+ – Jebel Akhdar War (1954–1959)
 206–345 – Arab separatism in Khuzestan (1922–2022)
 200+ – 1967 Opium War (1967)
 200 – Miami drug war (1970s-1980s)
 200 – 1935 Yazidi revolt (1935)
 174–194 – United States occupation of Veracruz (1914)
 160+ – Quebec Biker War (1994-2002)
 159 – ISIL insurgency in Tunisia (2015–present)
 141 – 2006 São Paulo violence outbreak (2006)
 126 – 2016 Kasese clashes (2016)
 115 – The Pool War (2016–present)
 108 – Islamist insurgency in Mozambique (2017–present)
 102–227 – India–Pakistan military confrontation (2016–present) (2016–present)
 99–500 – Sand War (1963–1964)
 95 – 2013 Guinea clashes (2013)
 84–134 – Lahad Datu standoff (2013)
 82 – Quasi-War (1798–1800)
 82 – North-West Rebellion (1885)
 71 – Paraguayan People's Army insurgency (2005–present)
 70+ – DHKP/C insurgency in Turkey (1990–present)
 63 – Ten-Day War (1991)
 62–72 – First Biker War (1977–1984)
 56+ – Dissident Irish Republican campaign (1998–present)
 50+ – Castellammarese War (1930–1931)
 50+ – Tong Wars (1800s–1930s)
 46 – Annexation of Dadra and Nagar Haveli (1954)
 45+ – 2020 China–India skirmishes (2020–present)
 41 – 2010 Rio de Janeiro security crisis (2010)
 39–111 – India–Pakistan border skirmishes (2014–2015) (2014–2015)
 37 – 2013 India–Pakistan border skirmishes (2013)
 36 – Yama-Ichi War (1986-1989)
 36 – 2016 Niger Delta conflict (2016–Present) – Part of the Conflict in the Niger Delta
 30+ – Aldermen's wars (1916–1921)
 23 – Mafia-Camorra War (1915–1917)
 20 – Satan's Choice–Popeyes War (1974–1976)
 20 – 2009 Vancouver gang war (2009)
 20 – Rowan County War (1884–1887)
 16 – Greene–Jones War (1860–present)
 16 – Piracy on Falcon Lake (2010–present)
 12–61 – 2017 Afghanistan–Pakistan border skirmish (2017) – Part of the Afghanistan–Pakistan skirmishes
 11–30 – 2008 Kufra conflict (2008)
 11+ – Tutt–Everett War (1844–1850)
 11 – Great Nordic Biker War (1994–1997)
 11 – Gombe Chimpanzee War (1974–1978)
 8 – 2011 India–Pakistan border skirmish (2011)
 7 – Bellevue War (1840)
 2+ – Ontario Biker War (1999–2002)
 2+ – Rock Machine-Rebels conflict (2009–present)

Charts and graphs

See also
Casualty recording
Timeline of wars
 List of wars and anthropogenic disasters by death toll
 List of battles by casualties
 List of number of conflicts per year
 Lists of wars
 List of ongoing armed conflicts
 List of genocides by death toll
 List of countries by refugee population

Notes

References

Works cited

Further reading
 Steven Pinker (2011). The Better Angels of Our Nature: Why Violence Has Declined. Penguin Books. . pp. 832. (see also: 2016 update)
 Levy, Jack S. (1983). War in the Modern Great Power System: 1495-1975. University Press of Kentucky, USA. .

External links
 An Interactive map of all the battles fought around the world in the last 4,000 years
 Information on 1,500 conflicts since 1800
 Max Roser: 'War and Peace'. (2016). Published online at OurWorldInData.org.

War and politics
Wars by death toll
Wars by death toll
Death toll
Death toll
Wars